Damir Vrančić (born 4 October 1985) is a Bosnian professional footballer who plays as a defensive midfielder.

Club career

Vrančić made his professional debut for German Bundesliga side 1. FSV Mainz 05 in 2006. After his club's relegation to the 2. Bundesliga at the end of the season, he regularly played for Mainz at the beginning of the 2007–08 2. Bundesliga season, but started to see less playing time as the season went on. For 2008–2009 Vrančić transferred to Borussia Dortmund's reserve squad in the Regionalliga West. After one season in Dortmund, he joined Eintracht Braunschweig, playing in the 3. Liga at the time. During his time in Braunschweig, the team achieved promotion to the 2. Bundesliga in 2011, and to the Bundesliga in 2013. On the 31st matchday of the 2012–13 season, Vrančić scored the decisive goal from a free-kick in injury time when Braunschweig secured its return to the Bundesliga after a 28 years absence with a 1–0 away win over FC Ingolstadt 04.

In June 2016, Vrančić joined 3. Liga side Hallescher FC on a free transfer. However, only 13 days later the contract was terminated by mutual consent, citing health reasons. On 12 October 2016, Vrančić joined Niedersachsenliga side FT Braunschweig as playing assistant manager.

International career
Vrančić was called up to Bosnia and Herzegovina in May 2007, but did not play. He finally made his debut for Bosnia and Herzegovina on 26 May 2012, in a friendly against the Republic of Ireland. He earned four caps in total. His final international was a September 2012 World Cup qualification match away against Liechtenstein.

Personal life
Vrančić's younger brother Mario is also a professional footballer.

References

External links

 
 

1985 births
Living people
Sportspeople from Slavonski Brod
Bosnia and Herzegovina emigrants to Germany
Croats of Bosnia and Herzegovina
Association football midfielders
Bosnia and Herzegovina footballers
Bosnia and Herzegovina international footballers
1. FSV Mainz 05 players
Borussia Dortmund II players
Eintracht Braunschweig players
Eintracht Braunschweig II players
Bundesliga players
2. Bundesliga players
3. Liga players
Bosnia and Herzegovina expatriate footballers
Expatriate footballers in Germany
Bosnia and Herzegovina expatriate sportspeople in Germany